Anna Nikitina (born 1987) is a handball player from Kazakhstan. She has played on the Kazakhstan women's national handball team, and participated at the 2011 World Women's Handball Championship in Brazil.

References

1987 births
Living people
Kazakhstani female handball players